Phalaris coerulescens, the sunolgrass, is a plant in the family Poaceae.

External links

Universitat de les Illes Balears: Phalaris coerulescens

coerulescens
Taxa named by René Louiche Desfontaines
Flora of Malta